Hovav may refer to:

Hovav Sekulets (born 1986), Israeli singer better known as Hovi Star
Ramat Hovav, new official name Ne'ot Hovav, an industrial zone in southern Israel